Mohabbat Karna Mana Haiis a 2018 Pakistani drama serial aired on BOL Entertainment. The drama stars Adnan Siddiqui, Samiya Mumtaz, Adeel Chaudhry, Noor Khan in lead roles. The drama was first aired on 7 December 2018.

Cast
Adnan Siddiqui as Shadab Ahmed 
Samiya Mumtaz as Batool
Adeel Chaudhry as Ibad 
Noor Khan as Neelam
Alyy Khan as Dilawar
Sadaf Aashan as Amna
Natasha Ali as Sophia
Mahjabeen Habib as Nafeesa
Arslan Asad Butt as Qasim
Faheem Abbas as Akbar Ali Khan 
Adnan Shah Tipu as Mureed
Komal Meer as Rabia
Amir Shah as Faisal
Saima Kanwal as Bilqees
Zara Kiran as Tania
Osama Bin Ghazi as Mehtab
Mehboob Sultan as Zamaan
Abul Hassan as Farrukh
Nighat Zafar as Nurse
Shuja Sami

References

2018 Pakistani television series debuts
2019 Pakistani television series endings